Lenina is a given name, and may refer to:

 Lenina Crowne, the female protagonist in Aldous Huxley's 1932 dystopian novel Brave New World
 Lenina Huxley, a character in the 1993 action movie Demolition Man
"Lenina", a song by British band The Vapors from their 1981 album Magnets

Feminine given names